VNV may refer to:

Flemish National Union, a Nationalist Flemish political party in Belgium, founded by Staf de Clercq on 8 October 1933. De Clercq became known as den Leider ("the Leader")
VNV Nation, an Irish electronic music group resident in Germany

People 

 Viktor Nikolayevich Vladimirov (born 1979), Russian professional football player. He last played for FC Torpedo Vladimir
 Valentin Voloshinov
 Vladimir Voronin
 Vladislav Volkov

Places 

 Veps National Volost